Tonnay-Charente is a commune in the Charente-Maritime department, administrative region of Nouvelle-Aquitaine, France.

In the 18th century, it was the home town of prominent Irish physician Dr. Theobald Jennings and his son, Irish-born French General Charles Edward Jennings de Kilmaine who fought in the  American war of Independence and, more significantly, in the French revolutionary wars with Napoleon I of France. There is a personal portrait of General Kilmaine in the Hôtel de Ville (City Hall) of Tonnay-Charente. Rue Kilmaine, a street in Tonnay-Charente was named in his honor.

Population

See also
Charles Edward Jennings de Kilmaine
Communes of the Charente-Maritime department

References

External links 

 

Communes of Charente-Maritime